The George S. Mickelson Trail is a rail trail in the Black Hills region of South Dakota.

The main trail route extends , from Edgemont to Deadwood, with approximately nine miles of additional branch trails, including a three-mile (5 km) paved link from Custer to the Custer State Park completed in 2007.  Intermediate points along the route include the towns of Custer and Hill City, and a short branch provides access to the city of Lead.

Nearly all of the trail follows the route of an abandoned railroad branch line constructed by the Chicago, Burlington and Quincy Railroad in 1890-91 and last operated by the Burlington Northern Railroad in 1986.  The trail's route is mountainous, forested, and scenic, traversing the heart of the Black Hills and largely within the boundaries of the Black Hills National Forest, although there are parts of the trail that pass through privately owned land, where trail use is restricted to the trail only.  The trail alignment includes four tunnels and more than 100 converted railroad bridges.  There are fifteen established trailheads spaced along the route, all of which include vehicle parking, self-sale trail pass stations, vault toilets, and tables.  The trail surface is packed crushed limestone and gravel.

The trail is maintained by the South Dakota Department of Game, Fish, and Parks.  The first segment of the trail was opened in 1991, and the entire route was completed in 1998, and is the first rails to trails project in South Dakota. The trail is named after George S. Mickelson, the South Dakota governor who helped spearhead the project.

See also
List of rail trails
List of South Dakota state parks

References

External links
Mickelson Trail website
List of support services
Website with interactive map and trip planning tools for Mickelson Trail

Rail trails in South Dakota
State parks of South Dakota
Black Hills
Protected areas of Custer County, South Dakota
Protected areas of Fall River County, South Dakota
Protected areas of Lawrence County, South Dakota
Protected areas of Pennington County, South Dakota
Burlington Northern Railroad
Long-distance trails in the United States
National Recreation Trails in South Dakota
Black Hills National Forest
1991 establishments in South Dakota